Emery Avery John CM (born 18 June 1975) is a Trinidad and Tobago former professional footballer who played as a defender.

Career

Youth and College
John was born in Point Fortin. He attended Vessigny [Antilles] Government Secondary School and then Presentation College, and played college soccer for Yavapai College in Arizona and American University in Washington, DC. In his four seasons with American, John was named First Team All-Colonial Athletic Association and Second Team All-South Atlantic Region in his second year. In that same year, he helped win the CAA Championship and bring the team into the NCAA Quarterfinals.

Professional
In July 1998, John joined the New Orleans Storm of the USISL. In 2000, upon graduating, John played briefly in the American A-League, with the Steve Nicol-coached Boston Bulldogs. John spent much of his early professional career playing in the League of Ireland. John is perhaps best known in Ireland for playing for Bohemians, with whom he spent two spells and worked under three different managers. John was a fan favourite with Bohemians, where he became a cult figure who had several songs in his honour. John also had a brief spell with Shelbourne, and Longford Town after having been denied a work permit to sign for Colchester United following a successful preseason in 2002.

John moved to the United States to play for New England Revolution, and his old coach Steve Nicol, in Major League Soccer in 2004. With the Revolution, John was a regular member of the starting line-up in all his four years with the team, and despite with injuries, international duty, and occasional loss of form, never appeared in fewer than 10 games in a season.

On 1 May 2008, John signed with Miami FC of the USL First Division and played 15 games for the side. On 23 April 2009, he signed with D.C. United, after the team completed a trade for his rights. The Revolution, which had retained his MLS rights, traded those rights, in exchange for a conditional draft pick in either the 2010 or 2011 MLS SuperDraft. John was released by D.C. United on 20 January 2010.

International
John appeared in over 50 matches with the Trinidad and Tobago national team. In his first match at the 2006 FIFA World Cup, he was dismissed with his second yellow card for a rash tackle on Sweden's Christian Wilhelmsson, making John the first player to be sent off in the tournament and causing him to miss Trinidad and Tobago's high-profile game with England.

Awards
As a member of the Trinidad and Tobago squad that competed at the 2006 FIFA World Cup  in Germany, John was awarded the Chaconia Medal (Gold Class), the second highest state decoration of Trinidad and Tobago.

References

External links
 

1975 births
Living people
People from Point Fortin
Trinidad and Tobago footballers 
Association football defenders
Yavapai Roughriders men's soccer players
American Eagles men's soccer players
New Orleans Riverboat Gamblers players
Maryland Mania players
Bohemian F.C. players
Boston Bulldogs (soccer) players
Shelbourne F.C. players
Longford Town F.C. players
New England Revolution players
Miami FC (2006) players
D.C. United players
USL First Division players
League of Ireland players
Major League Soccer players
Trinidad and Tobago international footballers
1998 CONCACAF Gold Cup players
2002 CONCACAF Gold Cup players
2005 CONCACAF Gold Cup players
2006 FIFA World Cup players
Trinidad and Tobago expatriate footballers
Trinidad and Tobago expatriate sportspeople in the United States
Trinidad and Tobago expatriate sportspeople in Ireland
Expatriate soccer players in the United States
Expatriate association footballers in the Republic of Ireland
Recipients of the Chaconia Medal